John Roberth Méndez Sánchez (born 24 June 1999) is a Guatemalan professional footballer who plays for Liga Nacional club Municipal and the Guatemalan national team.

International career
He debuted internationally on 3 March 2019 in a 3–1 friendly loss to El Salvador.

Méndez played with the Guatemala U22s in a match against Brazil at the World Youth Festival Toulon on 2 June 2019, in a 4-0 defeat.

On 4 June 2021, Méndez scored his first senior goal for Guatemala against St. Vincent and the Grenadines in a 2022 FIFA World Cup qualifying match which ended in a 10-0 victory.

Honours
Municipal 
Liga Nacional de Guatemala: Clausura 2017, Apertura 2019

References

External links
 
 

1999 births
Living people
Guatemalan footballers
Guatemala international footballers
Association football midfielders
C.S.D. Municipal players
Liga Nacional de Fútbol de Guatemala players